Grand Paris Express is a group of new rapid transit lines being built in the Île-de-France region of France. The project comprises four new lines for Paris Métro, plus extensions of existing Lines 11 and 14.

The new lines were originally indexed by colour (Red Line, Pink Line, Green Line), but this changed in 2013 to continue the numbering convention that the RATP uses. The new lines are therefore now known as 15, 16, 17 and 18. They are planned to open in stages through 2030.

Since August 2013, the New Grand Paris steering committee has met quarterly. Work on line 15 began in 2015. Its first section between  Métro station and Noisy–Champs RER A station was scheduled at that time to open around 2020, but this has now been pushed back to 2025. This line was first proposed in the Orbival project, then integrated into the Arc Express.

Line 11 extension 

To ensure better commuter service to the inner Northeastern suburbs, a six-station,  eastbound extension of Line 11 is under construction from Mairie des Lilas to Rosny-sous-Bois. The scheme was initially lobbied for by the local authorities of these suburbs, and was adopted during the 2007 review of the Île-de-France Transportation Plan. Work on the extension to Rosny – Bois-Perrier started in 2015 and it is expected to open by the end of 2023. It will provide new connections with the RER E and the extended Île-de-France tramway Line 1, which it will better link to central Paris and the commuter hub of Châtelet–Les Halles.

Revisions in the Grand Paris Express Plan and possible automation 

A revised plan for the proposed Grand Paris Express subway system was unveiled on 6 March 2013, and calls for a second extension of Line 11 to be built towards . The target opening date is 2030, but might be pushed back. Should the second extension be built, Line 11 will eventually be fully automated. Automatic train operation is not currently planned for the Rosny extension, although the RATP and STIF had considered the possibility of adding it later on.

Rolling stock 
As of March 2013, it was expected that additional MP 14 stock will be used for line 11. Unlike lines 14 and 4, these MP 14's will be manually driven and will replace the MP 59. As of October 2022, the trains are currently in test at the Rosny extension. Passenger service is expected to start in summer 2023.

Line 14 extension

Northern extension of line 14 
An additional station connects with the  RER C station, and another with the Transilien Paris – Saint-Lazare lines at Pont-Cardinet, and the final one with the RER D at Saint-Denis Pleyel. Construction on the extension began in 2014, with an aim of completion by 2019. Completion was later pushed back to 2020 after flooding from the water table stopped the tunnel works for a year. The covid-19 pandemic then further delayed the opening to December 2020. By mid-2024, promptly before the Olympics, the extension should be open.

Southern extension of line 14 
Line 14 is also being extended south from Olympiades towards Orly Airport.

When both extensions are complete, it is expected that Line 14 will eventually be merged into the proposed Grand Paris Express system.

Rolling stock 

In February 2012 the STIF announced that with the two extensions planned, the brand new MP 14 class of rolling stock will replace the MP 89CA and MP 05 stock on Line 14 starting from 2020. This new stock would be in eight-car train formations, something not yet employed on the Paris Métro but allowed by the length of all Line 14 stations. The current MP 89CA and MP 05 stock would then be reassigned to line 4, alongside some 6-car MP 14s. They will replace the manually driven MP 89 CC rolling stock, which will be refurbished before going to line 6 to replace the aging MP 73 rolling stock .

Line 15 

Line 15 will be a high-capacity underground rail line, providing a new ring line around Paris in the departments of Hauts-de-Seine, Val-de-Marne and Seine-Saint-Denis. It will enable direct journeys between the suburbs, bypassing Paris. The configuration of the line is very similar to that of the Arc Express, proposed by the RATP in 2006. It was later included in the red line project of the Grand Paris public transportation network, introduced by French President Nicolas Sarkozy in 2009. In March 2013, the "New Grand Paris" project was announced by the Prime Minister at the time, Jean-Marc Ayrault. At this time, the line acquired its current line 15 naming.

Line 15 is planned to open in phases from 2025 through 2030. It will create a loop connecting Noisy–Champs to Champigny, passing through Champigny-sur-Marne, Créteil, Villejuif, La Défense, Saint-Denis and Rosny-sous-Bois.

Proposed timeline 
On 22 February 2018, a new timeline is announced by Prime minister Édouard Philippe:

 During 2014: Public inquiry on the eastern section from Saint-Denis Pleyel to Champigny Centre.
 Early 2015: Groundbreaking of the southern section spanning Pont-de-Sèvres to Noisy–Champs.
 2024, postponed to 2025 in September 2018: Southern section from Pont de Sèvres to Noisy-Champs put into service.
 2030: western section from Pont de Sèvres to Saint-Denis Pleyel and eastern section from Saint-Denis Pleyel to Champigny Centre put into service.

Previous timeline 
In 2013, the government led by Ayrault proposed this timeline for the line 15 project:
 2014: Public inquiry on the eastern section from Saint-Denis Pleyel to Champigny Centre.
 Early-2015: Groundbreaking for the southern section between Pont-de-Sèvres and Noisy–Champs.
 2020: Groundbreaking of the section from Pont-de-Sèvres to Nanterre and from Saint-Denis Pleyel to Rosny-Bois-Perrier on the northern section.
 2022: Southern section from Pont-de-Sèvres to Noisy–Champs opens.
 Early 2025: Segments from Pont-de-Sèvres to Nanterre and from Saint-Denis Pleyel to Rosny-Bois-Perrier of the northern section put into service.
 2025: Groundbreaking of the segment from Nanterre to Saint-Denis Pleyel via La Défense-Grande-Arche of the northern section.
 Early 2030: Segment from Nanterre to Saint-Denis Pleyel via La Défense-Grande-Arche of the northern section put into service.
 End of 2030: Northern section from Rosny to Champigny completed.

Rolling stock 

Alstom has been chosen to build these trains. The names of the trains are the Alstom Metropolis MR3V/MR6V (MR6Y (6-car variant for line 15) and MR3Y (3-car variant for lines 16 and 17)) 

The specifications of the trains travelling line 15 and their operation are as follows:
 Train width:  minimum
 Train length: , made up of 6 cars with full-open interior gangways
 Train capacity: 960 passengers (at 4 passengers per m²)
 Bearings: iron
 Electric traction current: 1500 volt direct current via pantograph and contact wires
 Operation: Fully automated
 Maximum speed: 
 Operating speed: 
 Theoretical morning rush hour throughput: 34 560 passengers per hour
 Average interval: 3 to 4 minutes
 Minimum interval: 2 minutes

Lines 16 and 17 

Line 16 is planned to open in between 2026 and 2028.

Line 17 is planned to open in phases between 2026 and 2030.

Rolling stock 
The rolling stocks for the line is the Alstom Metropolis MR3V (3-car variant)

Line 18 

Line 18 is planned to open in phases between 2026 and 2030.

Rolling stock 
Alstom has been chosen to build these trains. The rolling stock that will run on line 18 is MRV (Paris Métro)

References

External links 
  

Rail transport in Paris
Proposed rail infrastructure in Europe
Paris Métro line 16
Paris Métro line 14
Paris Métro line 11
Paris Métro line 15
Paris Métro line 17
Paris Métro line 18
Rapid transit systems under construction